The International Ecological Safety Collaborative Organization (abbreviated IESCO) was established in 2006 in China and founded as an international organization. It had cooperation with some related UN agencies and was in compliance with UN Millennium Development Goals (MDGs).

Structure 
The World Ecological Safety Assembly (Presidium) - the highest authority of IESCO

The Executive Committee - the executive body of the Assembly

Executive Chairperson -  Sok An

Director-General -  Jiang Mingjun

Regional offices 
The Secretariat of IESCO, New York (IGO)

The Secretariat of IESCO, Hong Kong (NGO)

Conferences 
World Ecological Safety Assembly (every two years)

World Ecological Safety Expo (every two years)

Euro-Asia Ecological Safety Conference (annually)

History 
In 2006, IESCO was established.

In 2010, IESCO - Observer’s status at the International Conference of Asian Political Parties (ICAPP).

In 2011, IESCO - Special consultative status at UN Economic and Social Council (UN-ECOSOC) and observer's status at the plenary meeting of UN-ECOSOC and observer's status at UN Alliance of Civilizations.

In 2012, IESCO - Advisory institution of ICAPP and the Permanent Conference of Political Parties of Latin America and the Caribbean (COPPPAL).

In 2013, IESCO and  UN-Habitat started to cooperate to implement "UN Youth Empowerment and Urban Ecological Safety" programmes.

UN Committee of Youth Empowerment and Ecological Safety Program 
"UN Committee of Youth Empowerment and Ecological Safety" is a Program of UN-Habitat and IESCO which was co-launched in April, 2013 and established in August, 2013.—UN Youth Empowerment and Urban Ecology Committee --

 Honorary Chairman -  Joan Clos   (UN Under-Secretary-General and Executive Director of UN-Habitat)
 Director -  Banji Oyelaran-Oyeyinka (Director of the Global Monitoring and Research Division at UN-Habitat)
 Executive Director -  Jiang Mingjun (Director-General of IESCO)
 Deputy Directors -  Shan Fengping (Deputy Directors-General of IESCO)
 Vice presidents -  Gulelat Kebede (Director of Urban Economy and Finance at UN-Habitat)
 Vice presidents -  An Xueli (Deputy Director General of IESCO)
 Vice presidents -  Mutinta Adeline Munyati (Attaché of the Global Monitoring and Research Division at UN-Habitat)
 Senior Advisor -  Anantha Krishnan (Attaché of the Global Monitoring and Research Division at UN-Habitat)
 Secretary General -  Victoria Agnes Chebet (Attaché of the Global Monitoring and Research Division at UN-Habitat)

Publications 
 International Ecological and Safety
 UN Initiative and Technology for the Youth (with UN–Habitat)

See also 
 World Ecological Safety Assembly

Notes and references

External links 
 Official website of the International Ecological Safety Collaborative Organization
 Official website of International Ecological and Safety (English)
 Official website of UN Initiative and Technology for the Youth (English)

Ecology organizations
Environmental organizations based in China
Intergovernmental organizations
International environmental organizations